Foreign relations of Libya throughout history went through several periods:

Foreign relations of Libya, for relations since 2011
Foreign relations of Libya under Muammar Gaddafi, for 1969–2011
Kingdom of Libya#International relations, for 1951–1969